Every Girl may refer to:

Every Girl (album), by Trisha Yearwood, 2019
"Every Girl" (Stellar song), 2000
"Every Girl" (Young Money song), 2009
"Every Girl", a 2014 song by Allah-Las

See also